Bucephalandra tetana is a species of flowering plant in the family Araceae, native to Kalimantan on Borneo. It is a petite rheophyte, found on mossy granite rocks alongside rivers.

References

Aroideae
Endemic flora of Borneo
Plants described in 2014